The American Sheet and Tin Mill Apartment Building, one of the Edison Concept Houses, is a historic building at 633 West 4th Avenue in Gary, Indiana. The building was designed by D. F. Creighton and built in 1910. It was added to the National Register of Historic Places on June 17, 2009. It was built by the United States Sheet & Tin Plate Co.

Thousands moved to Gary in the early 1900s for work in burgeoning steel industry. Providing housing quickly and affordably, Thomas Edison's 1906 proposal of pouring a concrete mixture into a single mold for the facades, roof, stairs, walls, and other parts of a house was adopted for company housing (Edison was not directly involved).

See also
 Polk Street Terraces Historic District
 National Register of Historic Places listings in Lake County, Indiana

References

Further reading
The Sheet and Tin Plate Company Edison Concept Houses of Gary, Indiana by Charles Vinz 12/11/08 Proximity magazine
Concrete Utopia
by The Staff of the Indiana Magazine of History September 3, 2012 Indiana public media. (historic file)

Residential buildings on the National Register of Historic Places in Indiana
Residential buildings completed in 1910
Buildings and structures in Gary, Indiana
National Register of Historic Places in Gary, Indiana
Company housing